Michael Iver Stensrud (born February 19, 1956) is a former American football defensive lineman who played for five teams in eleven seasons in the National Football League. He wrestled for Lake Mills High School, winning the super heavy weight bracket in the state tournament. He played college football at Iowa State University and was drafted in the second round of the 1979 NFL Draft.

References

American football defensive linemen
Houston Oilers players
Minnesota Vikings players
Tampa Bay Buccaneers players
Kansas City Chiefs players
Washington Redskins players
Iowa State Cyclones football players
1956 births
Living people
Players of American football from Iowa
People from Forest City, Iowa
People from Lake Mills, Iowa